The commune of Butezi is a commune of Ruyigi Province in eastern Burundi. The capital lies at Butezi.

References

Communes of Burundi
Ruyigi Province